This is a list of properties and historic districts in Iowa that are listed on the National Register of Historic Places. There are listings in all of Iowa's 99 counties, adding up to over 2,300 total.



Current listings by county
The following are approximate tallies of current listings by county. These counts are based on entries in the National Register Information Database as of April 24, 2008 and new weekly listings posted since then on the National Register of Historic Places web site. There are frequent additions to the listings and occasional delistings and the counts here are approximate and not official. New entries are added to the official Register on a weekly basis.  Also, the counts in this table exclude boundary increase and decrease listings which modify the area covered by an existing property or district and which carry a separate National Register reference number. The numbers of NRHP listings in each county are documented by tables in each of the individual county list-articles.

Adair County

Adams County

|}

Former listing

|}

Allamakee County

Appanoose County

Audubon County

Benton County

Black Hawk County

Boone County

Bremer County

Buchanan County

Buena Vista County

Butler County

|}

Calhoun County

Carroll County

Cass County

Cedar County

Cerro Gordo County

Cherokee County

Chickasaw County

|}

Former listing

|}

Clarke County

|}

Former listing

|}

Clay County

Clayton County

Clinton County

Crawford County

Dallas County

Davis County

Decatur County

|}

Delaware County

Des Moines County

Dickinson County

Dubuque County

Emmet County

|}

Fayette County

Floyd County

Franklin County

Fremont County

Greene County

Grundy County

|}

Guthrie County

|}

Former listings

|}

Hamilton County

|}

Hancock County

Hardin County

Harrison County

Henry County

Howard County

|}

Former listing

|}

Humboldt County

|}

Former listing

|}

Ida County

|}

Former listings

|}

Iowa County

Jackson County

Jasper County

Jefferson County

Johnson County

Jones County

Keokuk County

Kossuth County

|}

Former listings

|}

Lee County

Linn County

Louisa County

|}

Former listing

|}

Lucas County

Lyon County

Madison County

Mahaska County

Marion County

Marshall County

Mills County

|}

Mitchell County

Monona County

Monroe County

Montgomery County

Muscatine County

O'Brien County

|}

Osceola County

|}

Page County

Palo Alto County

|}

Plymouth County

Pocahontas County

|}

Polk County

Pottawattamie County

Poweshiek County

Ringgold County

|}

Former listings

|}

Sac County

Scott County

Shelby County

Sioux County

|}

Story County

Tama County

Taylor County

|}

Union County

|}

Van Buren County

Wapello County

Warren County

Washington County

Wayne County

|}

Webster County

Winnebago County

|}

Former listings

|}

Winneshiek County

Woodbury County

Worth County

|}

Wright County

See also

List of National Historic Landmarks in Iowa

References

 
Iowa